Who's Nailin' Paylin? is a 2008 American satirical pornographic film directed by Jerome Tanner and starring Lisa Ann. It satirizes former U.S. vice-presidential candidate Sarah Palin. Besides being a parody of Sarah Palin, the film includes spoofs of Hillary Clinton, Condoleezza Rice, Todd Palin and Bill O'Reilly.

Produced by Hustler Video, the film was shot in two days and includes five hardcore sex scenes spanning from the Paylin character's college years, home life in rural Alaska, and the 2008 U.S. presidential election.

On October 31, 2008, Hustler announced that Lisa Ann was going to star in "Obama is Nailin' Palin?" a scene that continued on the adventures of Lisa as Sarah Palin except this time Barack Obama would be lampooned as well. The scene is only available through their Hustler members' website with no plans to release it on a DVD. This "bonus scene" was released on election eve November 3, 2008.

Hustler produced several sequels to Who's Nailin' Paylin? with Lisa Ann reprising her role, although they all used the real spelling of Palin's name- Letterman's Nailin Palin, You're Nailin' Palin (an interactive point-of-view DVD with Alexis Texas as Miss California USA Carrie Prejean), Hollywood's Nailin Palin and Who's Nailin Palin 2.

Plot summary
The film opens in Serra Paylin's living room, when two Russian soldiers knock on the door seeking a tow-truck to lend assistance with their smoldering tank. After some small talk, flirting, and a knock-knock joke, a threesome ensues.

The second scene, referring back to the first, opens with a newspaper headline exclaiming "Paylin endorses Russian penetration!" Then focus shifts to the Faux News Studio, where character Bill Orally sits at the news desk. Orally praises Paylin's recent work in foreign relations, and criticizes what he characterizes as the "hypocritical left".

The third scene takes place in a Washington, D.C. hotel. A female campaign intern is attempting to prepare Serra for interaction with the press. The intern attempts to teach Serra how to correctly pronounce the word "absolutely", which Serra comedically renders as "you betcha". After a frustrating session, Serra leaves in search of "a warm glass of moo juice and some shut eye".  After Paylin leaves, the intern declares, "what a fucking air head". In response, Serra's husband slides out from under the bed and replies, "try living with her". The scene ends with an anal sex encounter between Mr. Paylin and the intern.

The fourth scene opens in Serra's bedroom, showing her falling into a fitful sleep, and segues into a dream sequence. In the dream, Paylin seduces her husband's business partner at their snowmobile dealership. The scene finishes with the encounter, returning to a Paylin continuing to toss and turn in her sleep.

The fifth scene is another dream, where Serra remembers her collegiate days at "The International University of I-DA-HO" in 1987. Young Serra listens and actively participates in a classroom discussion which focuses on topics in pseudo-science. Serra places the age of the Earth at 10,000 years and classifies fossils as a ruse by Satan to "trick mankind". After class, Young Serra asks the professor if he knows of any rituals to protect her from witchcraft. The professor assures her that vigorous cunnilingus will provide the required protection, and wastes no time demonstrating.

The sixth and final scene opens with a Bill Orally monologue delivered from the Faux News Studio. The Orally piece introduces a Paylin news conference in which she is to defend herself against charges of adultery. During a rambling monologue Paylin avoids answering the adultery question. After the press clears the room, the Hilly character emerges from beneath the podium. The film closes with a lesbian ménage à trois featuring Serra, Hilly, and Candilezza.

Production

Just a few days after the conclusion of the 2008 Republican National Convention, producers for Larry Flynt Publications posted an anonymous help-wanted ad on Craigslist in Los Angeles. The ad called for "a Sarah Palin look-alike for an adult film to be shot in the next 10 days", and specified a salary of $3,000 for the role. According to sex writer Violet Blue, this represented a "pretty shocking" salary for the role.

After being selected for the lead role, actress Lisa Ann had only four days to prepare. The actress prepared for the role by studying Palin's mannerisms during the vice-presidential debate against Joe Biden, as well as Tina Fey's impersonation of her on Saturday Night Live. She bought her Palin-esque costumes online from Macy's, and due to time constraints, altered the clothing herself. Filming began on October 11, 2008, and was completed in two days.

Reception
The film received mainly negative reviews. Critic John Patterson of The Guardian says that "the script's literary values are close to nil, and its political jabs... are often [close] to infantile." Patterson's review also cites "ridiculous dialogue" such as "Drill, baby, drill!" and "I'm speaking in tongues!"

On the other hand, the film's star Lisa Ann has received widespread attention for the role, including interviews by Marie Claire, Entertainment Tonight, and on radio shows. In the interview in Marie Claire, Lisa Ann reports that fans have been supportive of the movie, calling it "shrewd" and "funny". The actress also feels the film has a "much broader range" than most adult films.

When asked about the possibility of backlash, Lisa Ann replied, "Maybe some crazy right-wing activist will try and burn my house down... But I put myself in that target spot and it is what it is."

On the America's Newsroom program on October 13, Fox News personality Megyn Kelly said that the film is "disgusting, it's dirty -- [the American people] wouldn't want to see it", and questioned the project's legality. Later in the program, defense attorney David Wohl said that the film could be viewed as "a political hit piece", in which case it might be legally actionable.

On November 1, 2008, the Masked Avengers comedy duo prank called Palin by pretending to be Nicolas Sarkozy. (See main article, The Masked Avengers' prank on Sarah Palin.) "Sarkozy" commented that he enjoyed seeing "the documentary on your life, Hustler's Who's Nailin' Paylin?", to which the real Palin replied, "oh good, thank you".

On the British comedy quiz show QI, comedian Jimmy Carr opined that the film is "very good" and "it's a look-ee like-ee, but it'll do".

Awards and nominations

References

Sources

External links

MILF pornography
2000s pornographic films
Films about elections
Pornographic parody films
2008 United States presidential election in popular culture
2008 films
American political satire films
Adultery in films
Cultural depictions of Hillary Clinton
Cultural depictions of Sarah Palin
Films set in Alaska
Films set in Washington, D.C.
Films set in 1987
2000s parody films
American parody films
2008 comedy films
2000s English-language films
2000s American films